Fryent Country Park, together with Barn Hill Open Space, is a large park situated in the north of the London Borough of Brent. It covers 103 hectares (254 acres)  of rolling fields and small woods.

Fryent was also a ward of the London Borough of Brent. Its population at the 2011 Census was 13,445.

Significant features
A fish pond is found at the top of the Hill. Numerous other ponds can be seen in the rest of the park. Gotfords Hill and Beane Hill are other high points in the park. Parallel to Fryent Way is an ancient track known as Hell Lane or Eldestrete which may date back to Saxon times or earlier. There is also a farm near the Slough Lane entrance, one of the closest farms from the centre of London.

Wildlife

The woodland comprises English oak, hornbeam, elm, ash and some fruit trees which also occur in the hedges along with blackthorn. The park is considered the best surviving example of Middlesex countryside in the Brent basin and has a population of the nationally rare plant the narrow-leaved bitter-cress (Cardamine impatiens).

History

Barn Hill, called Bardonhill in 1547, was landscaped by Humphry Repton in 1792 as part of a local landowner's country park. The Fryent Park hay meadows are small remnants of two manors, one originally in the ownership of King Edward the Confessor.

Access

The park is bisected by the A4140 Fryent Way that links Kingsbury with Wembley, and which leads south-east towards the North Circular Road. A car park is available halfway down this road. The nearest underground is at Kingsbury Station on the Jubilee line, while the Barn Hill Open Area, or at least the summit of it, is nearer to Wembley Park and Preston Road stations. The 206 bus terminates on the south side of the park and other bus routes run to the east (Church Lane), north (Kingsbury Road) and west (Preston Hill). The Capital Ring footpath crosses the site. However, the road Fryent Way, linking Kingsbury Circle and Salmon Street, has no bus service.

Awards
Fryent Country Park was awarded a Green Flag Award in 2010/2011 for being a well-managed park or open space. The Green Flag Award scheme is the benchmark national standard for parks and green spaces in England and Wales. It is also a Local Nature Reserve.

In 2014 London in Bloom awarded the park a silver gilt award in its Country Park of the Year category.

Sport

The Liddiard Cup cross country race is annually staged here in late October.

Gallery

Bibliography
Ordnance Survey. (2006). No. 173 Explorer Map: London North. Southampton: Ordnance Survey.

Snow, Len. (1990). Brent, Wembley, Willesden and Kingsbury: A pictorial history. Chichester: Phillimore & Co Ltd.

See also

Parks and open spaces in the London Borough of Brent
Murders of Bibaa Henry and Nicole Smallman

References

External links

Brent Council's local management plan
Barn Hill Conservation Group's website
Barn Hill Conservation Group's 2007 management programme 

 

Parks and open spaces in the London Borough of Brent
Country parks in London
Local nature reserves in Greater London
Nature reserves in the London Borough of Brent